Oligospira skinneri is a species of air-breathing land snails, terrestrial pulmonate gastropod mollusks in the family Acavidae. It is endemic to Sri Lanka.

Description
Shell is shiny light brown to rosy in color with some small white spots on it. Lip of the shell is meat red. It is named after Major Skinner.

References

External links

Acavidae
Gastropods described in 1854